Teodor Banev  (born 7 August 1987 is a Bulgarian footballer, currently playing for Spartak Plovdiv as a defender.

External links
 Profile

1987 births
Living people
Bulgarian footballers
First Professional Football League (Bulgaria) players
Association football defenders
FC Maritsa Plovdiv players
PFC Lokomotiv Plovdiv players
FC Spartak Plovdiv players